Francis Cuffe (after 1675 – November 1717) was an Irish  politician.

He sat in the House of Commons of Ireland from 1715 to 1717, as a Member of Parliament for Mayo.

References 
 

1670s births
Year of birth uncertain
1717 deaths
Irish MPs 1715–1727
Members of the Parliament of Ireland (pre-1801) for County Mayo constituencies